Benur Pashayan (13 February 1959 – 13 December 2019) was a Soviet Armenian Greco-Roman wrestler. He was a two-time World, European, and Soviet Champion. Pashayan also won a gold medal at the 1984 Friendship Games during the Olympic boycott.

Biography
Benur Pashayan was born on 13 February 1959 in the village of Azavret within the Akhalkalak region of the Georgian SSR. He began Greco-Roman wrestling in Yerevan under the direction of Albert Mnatsakanyan and Harutyun Khachatryan. In 1977 and 1979 he became the Junior World Champion.

Pashayan was a 1981 Summer Universiade Champion, a two-time European Champion, having won consecutive gold medals at the 1981 and 1982 European Wrestling Championships, and a two-time and reigning World Champion, having also won consecutive gold medals at the 1982 and 1983 World Wrestling Championships. For 1983, he was recognized by the FILA as the best Greco-Roman wrestler.

Having been ranked first in his weight class the past two years, he was the gold medal favorite of the Greco-Roman flyweight (52 kg) division at the 1984 Summer Olympics. However, because of the 1984 Summer Olympics boycott, Pashayan was denied participation. Instead, he and the other Soviet and Soviet-affiliated athletes competed at the 1984 Friendship Games. Benur won a gold medal in wrestling at the Games.

He later participated at the Grand Prix of Germany in 1984 and 1985, having previously won the competition in 1982. Pashayan came in first place every time at the contest. He retired in 1985, undefeated in international competition.

From 1986 to 1989 he was the coach in Soviet Armenia, and in 1989 he graduated from the Armenian State Institute of Physical Culture. Pashayan later became the President of the National Olympic Committee of Armenia from 1999 to 2000.

References

External links
 

1959 births
2019 deaths
People from Samtskhe–Javakheti
Armenian State Institute of Physical Culture and Sport alumni
Armenian wrestlers
Soviet male sport wrestlers
Armenian male sport wrestlers
World Wrestling Championships medalists
Soviet Armenians
Universiade medalists in wrestling
Universiade gold medalists for the Soviet Union
European Wrestling Championships medalists
Georgian people of Armenian descent
Medalists at the 1981 Summer Universiade